The 2015 Pittsburgh Steelers season was the franchise's 83rd season as a professional sports franchise and as a member of the National Football League (NFL). It also marked the 16th season under leadership of general manager Kevin Colbert and the ninth under head coach Mike Tomlin. For the first time since 2002, safety Troy Polamalu was not on the opening day roster, as he announced his retirement on April 9.

The Steelers clinched the last AFC playoff spot, finishing tied with the New York Jets with a 10–6 record, but winning the tiebreaker over the Jets based on a better record vs. common opponents. The Steelers defeated the Cincinnati Bengals in the Wild Card round, but lost to the eventual Super Bowl champion Denver Broncos in the Divisional round.

2015 draft class

(+) Compensatory Selection

Undrafted free agents
All undrafted free agents were signed after the 2015 NFL draft concluded on May 2 unless otherwise noted.

Staff
2015 marked a transition period for the Steelers defense, as longtime defensive coordinator Dick LeBeau resigned January 10. A member of the Pro Football Hall of Fame due to his 14-year playing career with the Detroit Lions, LeBeau served 13 seasons as the Steelers defensive coordinator under Tomlin and his predecessor Bill Cowher over two stints (1995–1996 and 2004–2014), and whose zone blitz defense ranked within the Top 5 in the NFL in total defense in 11 of those 13 seasons. At the time of his resignation, LeBeau was the NFL's longest-active tenured defensive coordinator. LeBeau, 77, mentioned that it was a "resignation, not retirement."

On January 13, longtime linebackers coach Keith Butler was promoted to succeed LeBeau. Butler stated that the team will continue to run the 3–4 defense as its primary package, but will also run some 4–3 packages, essentially converting the system to a hybrid 3–4. The Steelers have run the 3–4 since 1982, the longest such use of the 3–4 in NFL history.

Final roster

Schedule

Training camp
The Steelers held training camp at Saint Vincent College in Latrobe, Pennsylvania. It marked the 50th straight year that training camp was held at the college nestled in the Laurel Highlands, the third-longest active streak in the NFL behind the Green Bay Packers and Minnesota Vikings, who have held their respective training camps at the same sites since 1958 and 1961, respectively.

The Steelers were scheduled to have joint practices with the Buffalo Bills this preseason but, due their commitment to play in the Pro Football Hall of Fame Game, they canceled the joint practices but agreed to still play a later preseason game against the Bills on August 29. The Bills then scheduled joint practices with the Cleveland Browns at St. John Fisher College in Rochester, NY which then culminated with a preseason game against them on August 20 in Cleveland.

Preseason

Regular season
Due to the modified scheduling changes that were made for the  season, 2015 marked several firsts for the Steelers. It marked the first time the Steelers have hosted the Arizona Cardinals since 2003 (having played them at University of Phoenix Stadium twice in that span, as well as Super Bowl XLIII), the first time hosting the Denver Broncos since 2006 (having played them five times since then, all at Sports Authority Field at Mile High), the first time playing the San Diego Chargers on the road since 2006 (having played them four times since, all at home, and ultimately the Steelers last trip to San Diego before the Chargers returned to Los Angeles in 2017) and the first time visiting the Seattle Seahawks since 2003, having played them away from Seattle three times since, twice at home as well as Super Bowl XL.

Note: Intra-division opponents are in bold text.

Postseason

Game summaries

Regular season

Week 1: at New England Patriots
NFL Kickoff game

The Steelers opened their season on the road against the defending Super Bowl Champion Patriots.  After a scoreless first quarter, the Patriots scored first in the second quarter when Tom Brady found Rob Gronkowski on 2 consecutive touchdown passes:  from 16 and 6 yards out for leads of 7–0 and 14–0.  The Steelers got on the board before halftime when Josh Scobee kicked a 44-yard field goal for a 14–3 game.  In the third quarter, Brady found Scott Chandler on a 1-yard touchdown pass for a 21–3 lead.  The Steelers responded with Will Johnson's 1-yard run for a touchdown and a 2-point conversion tacked on for a 21–11 game.  In the fourth quarter, the Steelers scored again as Scobee kicked a 24-yard field goal.  Brady and Gronkowski hooked up again on a 1-yard pass for a 28–14 lead.  Getting the ball back with seconds left, Ben Roethlisberger found Antonio Brown on an 11-yard touchdown pass for a final score of 28–21.

With the loss, the Steelers started their season 0–1.  It also dropped the team to 2–1 in Kickoff Games.

Week 2: vs. San Francisco 49ers

After a tough loss, the Steelers went home to take on the 49ers.  They struck first in the first quarter when Ben Roethlisberger found Heath Miller on a 2-yard TD pass (with a successful 2-point conversion) for an 8–0 lead.  The Niners were able to get on the board in the second quarter when Phil Dawson kicked a 47-yard field goal shortening the lead to 8–3.  The Steelers however pulled away later on as De'Angelo Williams ran for a 2-yard TD (with another successful 2-point conversion) for a 16–3 lead followed up by Roethlisberger finding Darrius Heyward-Bay on a 35-yard TD pass (with a failed PAT) for a 22–3 lead and finally Williams rushing for another 2-yard TD before halftime to take a 29–3 lead.  After a scoreless third quarter, the Niners went to work in the fourth when Colin Kaepernick found Anquan Boldin on a 14-yard TD pass to move behind 29–10.  The Steelers however pulled away when Williams ran for a 1-yard TD to move on up 36–10.  The Niners drew closer when Kaepernick found Torrey Smith on a 75-yard TD pass (with a successful 2-point conversion) to make the score 36–18.  The Steelers however wrapped up the scoring of the game when Roethlisberger found Antonio Brown on a 7-yard TD pass for the final score 43–18.

With the win, the Steelers improved to 1–1.

The defense had a field day on Kaepernick by sacking him 5 times and forcing a fumble which they recovered.

Week 3: at St. Louis Rams

Coming off their big home win over San Francisco, the Steelers traveled to St. Louis to take on the Rams in the Edward Jones Dome. After a long delay before the game due to the field catching fire from a pyrotechnical error during the Rams' entrance, the game got underway. Pittsburgh got on the board early with a Josh Scobee field goal, and held the Rams scoreless for the first quarter. Early in the second quarter, Rams' kicker Greg Zuerlein gave them a field goal, tying the game. But, the returning Le'Veon Bell scored on a one-yard run in the second quarter; Pittsburgh failed to convert on a two-point play, but lead 9–3. The score remained this way for most of the game, and neither team scored in the third quarter. Quarterback Ben Roethlisberger injured his left knee mid-third quarter; he was carted off-field and Michael Vick replaced him for the remainder of the game. Zuerlein added to the Rams' score with another field goal, inching the Rams closer 9–6. But, Scobee kicked another field goal for the Steelers, increasing their lead 12–6. St. Louis failed to convert late in the game, and Vick kneeled down to end the game.

With their win and a Cleveland loss to Oakland, the Steelers improved to 2–1 and took sole possession of second in the AFC North.

Week 4: vs. Baltimore Ravens

Justin Tucker made a 52-yard field goal with 5:08 left in overtime to give the Baltimore Ravens a 23–20 victory over the Pittsburgh Steelers on Thursday night.

Tucker tied it with 3 seconds to go in regulation after Pittsburgh's Josh Scobee missed a pair of kicks that would have given the Steelers some cushion. Tucker then won it in the extra period after the Steelers failed to convert a pair of fourth downs in Baltimore territory.

The Steelers defense had another stellar outing, sacking Joe Flacco five times and forcing two turnovers. Michael Vick threw for 124 yards and a score and avoided committing any turnovers while starting in place of the injured Ben Roethlisberger. All helped lead the team to a 20–7 lead early in the third quarter. However, the Steelers offense stalled after, and Baltimore took advantage dropping the team to 2–2.

Antonio Brown's 5/50 receiving streak was broken after 35 consecutive games. He finished with 5 receptions, but missed the 50-yard mark by 8 yards.

Week 5: at San Diego Chargers

After a tough home loss to the Ravens, the Steelers traveled to San Diego to take on the Chargers.  The Chargers scored first in the first quarter when Philip Rivers found Antonio Gates on a 12-yard pass for a 7–0 lead.  The Steelers got on the board in the 2nd quarter when Chris Boswell nailed a 47-yard field goal for a 7–3 game at halftime.  After the break, the Steelers took the lead as Antwon Blake picked off Philip Rivers and returned it 70 yards for a TD and a 10–7 lead for the only score of the period.  In the 4th quarter the Chargers scored 10 points first tying the game 10–10 when Josh Lambo kicked a 40-yard field goal followed up by Rivers and Gates hooking up again this time on an 11-yard TD pass for a 17–10 lead.  The Steelers tied the game back up when Michael Vick found Markus Wheaton on a 72-yard TD pass for a 17–17 game.  The Chargers retook the lead when Lambo kicked a 54-yard field goal for a 20–17 lead.  Getting the ball back with less than 2 minutes left, the Steelers drove down the field.  Le'Veon Bell ran for a TD from a yard out as time expired to win the game.  With the game 23–20, officials had to review it to make sure he reached in before his knee hit the ground.  The call stood and then Boswell kicked the PAT for a 24–20 victory.

The Steelers defense continued their surprising resurgence of sacks and takeaways by sacking Rivers twice and getting two more turnovers. The offense scored on their final possession as time expired to clinch a much-needed road win against the Chargers. The win improved the Steelers to 3–2 on the season and snapped a five-game losing streak in California.

Week 6: vs. Arizona Cardinals

After a tough road win over the Bolts, the Steelers returned home to take on the Cardinals.  The Cards would strike first in the first quarter when Carson Palmer found Michael Floyd on a 3-yard pass for a 7–0 lead for the only score of the period.  The Steelers got on the board in the 2nd quarter when Chris Boswell nailed a 47-yard field goal for a 7–3 game before the Cards moved ahead by a TD after Chandler Catanzaro kicked a field goal of his own from 31 yards out for a 10–3 game at halftime.  After the break, in the third quarter it was all Steelers as Boswell kicked another field goal.  This was from 48 yards out to get the Steelers within 4, 10–6.  3rd-string QB Landry Jones replaced Michael Vick for the rest of the game and threw his first career TD to Martavis Bryant from 8 yards out (with a failed 2-point conversion) and a 12–10 lead.  Boswell hit a field goal from 51 yards out to send the Steelers up by 5, 15–10.  In the fourth quarter, the Cards narrowed the Steelers' lead as Catanzaro kicked a 39-yard field goal for a 15–13 game.  The Steelers increased their lead when Boswell made a 28-yard field goal for an 18–13 game.  Finally, they were able to seal the game when Jones found Bryant on an 88-yard pass for the final score of 25–13.

With the win, the Steelers improved to 4–2.  The defense also continued their stellar outings in sacks and takeaways such as sacking Palmer once, picking him off twice, and recovering a fumble.

Week 7: at Kansas City Chiefs

The Steelers traveled to Kansas City to take on the Chiefs.  In the first quarter, the Chiefs scored first when Cairo Santos kicked a 30-yard field goal for a 3–0 lead.  The Steelers would tie it up later on as Chris Boswell nailed a field goal from 24 yards out to make the game 3–3.  In the second quarter, it was all Chiefs when Santos nailed 2 more field goals:  from 27 and 22 yards out moving ahead 6–3 and the eventual halftime score of 9–3.  After the break, the Chiefs moved ahead by double digits when Chircandrick West ran for a 1-yard touchdown for a 16–3 game.  Backup QB Landry Jones was able to find Martavis Bryant on a 19-yard pass to make the score 16–10 for the Steelers later on in the third quarter.  In the fourth quarter, the Steelers came within 3 when Boswell nailed another field goal from 36-yards out for a 16–13 game.  However, the Chiefs eventually sealed the win when Alex Smith found Chris Conley on a 6-yard pass for a final score of 23–13.

With the loss, the Steelers fell to 4–3 and also 2–2 without Roethlisberger as the starter.

The defense failed to force any takeaways, but got inside the pocket and sacked Smith twice.

Week 8: vs. Cincinnati Bengals

After the tough loss to the Chiefs, the Steelers returned home for a game against the Bengals in a much-hyped game due to Ben Roethlisberger being back from injury.  This was also game 1 of a 3-game home stand.

In the first quarter, the Steelers took an early lead as Ben found Antonio Brown on a 1-yard pass for a 7–0 lead.  Later on, the Bengals came within 4 as Mike Nugent nailed a 44-yard field goal for a 7–3 game.  In the second quarter, the Bengals came within a point as Nugent nailed a 45-yard field goal for a 7–6 game at halftime.  In the third quarter, the Steelers increased their lead back to 4 as Chris Boswell nailed a 32-yard field goal to make it 10–6.  In the fourth quarter however, it was all Bengals as they took the lead when Andy Dalton found A. J. Green on a 9-yard pass for a 13–10 game followed up by Nugent nailing another 44-yard field goal for the final score of 16–10.

With the loss, the Steelers fell to 4–4. Not only did they lose the game, but they also lost star running back Le'Veon Bell for the season due to a torn MCL. 
 
Despite the loss, the defense had yet another stellar outing by picking off Dalton twice and sacking him three times.

Week 9: Oakland Raiders

The Steelers stayed home for Game 2 of a 3-game home stand against the Raiders.  In the first quarter, the Raiders scored first as Derek Carr found Michael Crabtree on a 22-yard pass for a 7–0 lead.  The Steelers got on the board later on in the quarter when Chris Boswell kicked a 34-yard field goal for a 7–3 game.  In the 2nd quarter, the Steelers took the lead when DeAngelo Williams ran for a TD from 3 yards out (with a successful 2-point conversion) for an 11–7 game.  The Raiders however, retook the lead when Carr found Amari Cooper on a 15-yard pass for a 14–11 lead.  The Steelers closed the half when Williams ran for another 3-yard TD and Boswell kicked a 38-yard field goal for leads of 18–14 and then 21–14 at halftime.  After the break, the Raiders went back to work tying the game up 21–21 when Carr found Clive Walford on a 1-yard pass for the only score of the third quarter.  In the fourth quarter, the Steelers were able to retake the lead as Ben Roethlisberger found Martavis Bryant on a 14-yard pass for a 28–21 game.  Roethlisberger then found Jesse James on a 4-yard pass for a 35–21 game.  The Raiders would tie the game back up with 2 straight TDs of their own:  First coming from Jamize Olawale who ran from 19 yards out for a 35–28 game and then Carr finding Crabtree again on a 38-yard pass to make it 35–35.  Getting the ball back with seconds left, the Steelers had to depend on backup QB Landry Jones to help them get within field goal range.  They would successfully do so and then Boswell kicked the game-winning 18-yard field goal for a 38–35 final score.

With the win, the Steelers improved to 5–4.

The defense failed to sack Carr, but recorded 4 takeaways.

Week 10: vs. Cleveland Browns

The Steelers' last game in the 3-game home stand was against the Browns. Backup QB Landry Jones started the game, but left due to injury and was replaced by Ben Roethlisberger. In the first quarter, the Steelers grabbed an early lead as Chris Boswell nailed a 24-yard field goal for a 3–0 lead. However, the Browns tied it up at 3–3 when Travis Coons kicked a 23-yard field goal.  The Steelers would retake the lead later on in the quarter when Boswell nailed a 34-yard field goal for a 6–3 game.  In the second quarter, it was all Steelers when Roethlisberger found Antonio Brown on a 4-yard pass (with a successful 2-point conversion) for a 14–3 lead followed up by Roethlisberger finding Martavis Bryant on a 32-yard pass for a 21–3 lead at halftime.  In the third quarter, the Steelers went back to work as Boswell kicked a 25-yard field goal for a 24–3 game for the only score of the period.  In the fourth quarter, Johnny Manziel found Gary Barnidge on a 7-yard pass (with a failed PAT) for a 24–9 game.  The Steelers later on would wrap the game up when Roethlisberger and Brown hooked up again this time on a 56-yard pass (with a failed PAT) for the final score of 30–9.

With the win, the Steelers head into their bye week at 6–4, and finally won a game within their division while also winning consecutive conference games for the first time in the season.  The team also improves to 3–2 when Ben doesn't start and also finishes 2–1 in the 3-game home stand.

The defense also stood out by sacking Manziel 6 times and got 3 turnovers.

Week 11: Bye Week
No game. Pittsburgh had a bye week.

Week 12: at Seattle Seahawks

Coming off their bye week, the Steelers traveled to Seattle to take on the Seahawks.  The Steelers scored first when Chris Boswell kicked a 44-yard field goal for a 3–0 lead for the only score of the period.  In the second quarter, the Seahawks were able to take a 7–3 lead when Russell Wilson found Doug Baldwin on a 16-yard pass.  The Steelers retook the lead when Martavis Bryant ran for an 11-yard TD for a 10–7 game.  Wilson then found Jermaine Kearse on a 12-yard pass for a 14–10 lead.  De'Angelo Williams ran for a 6-yard TD (with a successful 2-point conversion) to take an 18–14 lead at halftime.  In the third quarter, the Steelers increased their lead when Boswell nailed a 25-yard field goal for a 21–14 lead.  The Seahawks would come within 1 when Thomas Rawls made a 1-yard TD run (with a failed PAT) for a 21–20 game.  Wilson found Kearse again this time on a 9-yard pass (with a failed 2-point conversion) to move ahead 26–20.  The Steelers then retook the lead when Ben Roethlisberger found Bryant on a 69-yard pass (with a failed 2-point conversion) for a 27–26 game.  But the Seahawks would move back into the lead when Wilson found Baldwin again this time on a 30-yard pass (with a failed 2-point conversion) for a 32–27 game.  The Steelers came within 2 when Boswell nailed a 22-yard field goal for a 32–30 game.  But the Seahawks wrapped the game up when Wilson found Baldwin on an 80-yard pass for the final score of 39–30.

With the loss, the Steelers dropped to 6–5.

The defense failed to get any takeaways but sacked Wilson twice.

Week 13: vs. Indianapolis Colts

After a tough road loss, the Steelers returned home.  With their record at 6–5, they faced off against the 6–5 Colts in a rematch of 2014's 51–34 blowout win.  Adam Vinatieri was able to get the Colts an early 3–0 lead when he kicked a 35-yard field goal.  The Steelers would get on the board when Chris Boswell kicked a 29-yard field goal for a 3–3 tie and then move into the lead when he kicked a 51-yard field goal for a 6–3 lead.  The Colts retook the lead in the 2nd quarter when Matt Hasselbeck found Frank Gore on a 9-yard pass for a 10–6 game.  Though the Steelers responded with 2 straight touchdowns of their own:  Ben Roethlisberger found Antonio Brown on a 7-yard pass (with a successful 2-point conversion) retaking the lead 14–10 followed by Roethlisberger finding Markus Wheaten on a 5-yard pass to move ahead 21–10 at halftime.  In the second half, it was all Steelers when Roethlisberger found Martavis Bryant on a 68-yard pass for a 28–10 game and only score of the third quarter.  In the fourth quarter, Roethlisberger and Brown hooked up again this time on a 5-yard pass for a 35–10 game.  Boswell then put a 42-yard field goal through for a 38–10 game.  Finally, the Steelers wrapped the scoring up when Brown returned a punt 71 yards for a touchdown making the final score 45–10.

With the win, the Steelers improved to 7–5.

The defense had yet another stellar outing by forcing 3 turnovers and getting 5 sacks (2 on Hasselbeck, 3 on Whitehurst)

Week 14: at Cincinnati Bengals

After winning at home, the Steelers traveled to Cincinnati for Game 2 against the Bengals. Before the game started there were an altercation between the two teams during warmups. Vince Williams and Vontaze Burfict were in the center of the scuffle. The game began with a score on the very first drive, when DeAngelo Williams ran for a 1-yard TD for a 7–0 lead and would increase their lead in the 2nd quarter, when Chris Boswell went for 2 field goals:  From 42 and 47 yards out for 10–0 and 13–0 leads.  QB Andy Dalton would be knocked out of the game so backup QB A. J. McCarron came in and threw his first career TD pass to A. J. Green from 66 yards out to make the score 13–7.  Boswell, however, wrapped up the scoring of the first half with another 47 yard field goal for a 16–7 lead at halftime.  In the third quarter, the Steelers went back to work as William Gay picked off A. J. McCarron and returned it 23 yards for a TD for a 23–7 game.  Mike Nugent would kick a 46-yard field goal to make it 23–10.  The Steelers went back to work in the fourth quarter when Boswell kicked a 31-yard field goal for a 26–10 game.  The Bengals responded with Nugent kicking a 27-yard field goal for a 26–13 game.  Later on however, the Steelers would pretty much seal the game when Williams ran for another 1-yard TD for a 33–13 game.  The Bengals would wrap up the scoring of the game when McCarron found Rex Burkhead on a 5-yard pass for a 33–20 final score.

With the win, the Steelers improved to 8–5.  The defense also stood out and continued their reign of sacks and takeaways with 3 each (picked off Dalton once, picked off McCarron twice).

Week 15: vs. Denver Broncos

The Steelers traveled back home to take on the Broncos.  They would score first when D'Angelo Williams ran for a 2-yard TD for a 7–0 lead.  Not long before the Broncos scored 20 consecutive points starting with Brock Osweiler's 18-yard pass to Demyarius Thomas to tie the game at 7–7 and then taking the lead when Osweiler found Emmanuel Sanders on a 61-yard pass for a 14–7 lead.  In the second quarter, the Broncos increased their lead when Osweiler ran for a 7-yard TD (with a failed PAT) for a 20–7 game.  The Steelers would draw closer when Chris Boswell nailed a 24-yard field goal for a 20–10 game.  Though, the Broncos moved away when Osweiler found Thomas again on a 6-yard pass for a 27–10 game.  The Steelers started their reign of 24 consecutive points:  Starting with another field goal from Boswell from 41 yards out to make it 27–13 at halftime.  In the third quarter, Ben Roethlisberger found Antonio Brown on a 9-yard pass coming within 7 for the only score of the period, 27–20.  In the fourth quarter, the Steelers were able to tie the game up at 27–27 when Roethlisberger found Markus Wheaton on a 9-yard pass.  Finally, they wrapped up the scoring when Roethlisberger found Brown again this time on a 23-yard pass for the eventual final score of 34–27.

With the win, the Steelers improved to 9–5.

The defense stood out again as they got 2 takeaways and 2 sacks.

Week 16: at Baltimore Ravens

With the loss, the Steelers fell to 9–6, and were swept by the Ravens for the first time since the 2011 season. They also ended their streak of six straight games scoring 30 or more points. The loss also allowed the Bengals to clinch the AFC North title. The Steelers also fell out of the AFC Wildcard race and would need a win coupled with a loss by the New York Jets in Week 17 in order to make the playoffs.

The defense failed to get any takeaways but were able to get away with 2 sacks.

Week 17: at Cleveland Browns

After getting swept by the Ravens, the Steelers traveled to Cleveland for Round 2 against the Browns.  They would score early in the first quarter when Ben Roethlisberger found Heath Miller on a 2-yard pass for a 7–0 lead.  The Browns scored later on in the quarter when Travis Coons nailed a 29-yard field goal for a 7–3 game.  The Browns were able to shorten the lead to 1 point when Coons nailed another field goal in the second quarter from 39 yards out for a 7–6 game.  The Steelers however went back to work as Roethlisberger found Antonio Brown on a 17-yard pass for a 14–6 game.  The Browns wrapped up the scoring of the first half when Coons nailed a 33-yard field goal for a 14–9 game.  In the third quarter, Chris Boswell nailed a 39-yard field goal for the only score of the period moving up 17–9.  In the fourth quarter, the Browns drew closer when Coons got another 29-yard field goal for a 17–12 game.  But later on, the Steelers were able to seal the game when Roethlisberger found Markus Wheaton on an 8-yard pass (with a successful 2-point conversion) for a 25–12 game.  Finally, they sealed the deal with Boswell's 21-yard field goal for the final score 28–12.

With the win, the Steelers finished the season 10–6.  With the Jets' loss to the Bills, they were awarded the 6th seed in the AFC.

The defense stood out by getting 4 turnovers and 7 sacks.

Postseason

AFC Wild Card Playoffs: at #3 Cincinnati Bengals

The Cincinnati Bengals' playoff losing streak of 8 straight games nearly came to an end on Saturday. After trailing 15–0 in the fourth quarter the Bengals took a 16–15 lead late in the game, but a last-minute field-goal drive led to an 18–16 win for the Pittsburgh Steelers. The winning score was set up by back-to-back personal foul penalties against the Bengals.

Ben Roethlisberger (shoulder) and Antonio Brown (concussion) both left the game with injuries and both teams were penalized a combined 18 times for 221 yards. "Big Ben" did re-enter the game with 1:43 remaining in the fourth quarter to lead the Steelers into field goal range for the winning acore.

With the win, Pittsburgh moved on to face the No. 1 seed Denver Broncos in the Divisional round at Mile High Stadium.

AFC Divisional Playoffs: at #1 Denver Broncos

After the tough battle against the Bengals, the Steelers moved on to face the #1 seeded Broncos.  The Broncos would score early when Brandon McManus nailed a 28-yard field goal for a 3–0 lead.  Later on in the quarter, he would kick a 41-yard field goal for a 6–0 lead.  The Steelers took the lead later on in the quarter when Fitzgerald Touissaint ran for a 1-yard TD and a 7–6 game.  In the second quarter, the Steelers increased their lead as Chris Boswell kicked a 45-yard field goal for a 10–6 game.  But the Broncos came within a point when McManus kicked a 51-yard field goal for a 10–9 game at halftime.  Both teams would get off to slow starts with field goals in the third quarter:  The Steelers moved ahead by 4 when Boswell nailed one from 28 yards out for a 13–9 game.  This was followed up by the Broncos coming within a point again when McManus kicked a 41-yard field goal for a 13–12 game.  In the fourth quarter, the Broncos took the lead when C.J. Anderson ran for a 1-yard TD (with a successful 2-point conversion) for a 20–13 game.  This was followed up by McManus kicking a 45-yard field goal for a 23–13 game.  The Steelers wrapped the scoring up coming within 7 when Boswell nailed a 47-yard field goal for the final score of 23–16.

After the game, sources said that Steelers coach Mike Tomlin was sobbing in the locker room following the loss. Wide receiver Martavis Bryant stated that he had "never seen him (coach Tomlin) cry before."

With the loss, the Steelers season ended with an overall record of 11–7.

Standings

Division

Conference

Statistics
Updated January 4, 2016

Team

Passing

Rushing

Receiving

Field Goals

Punting

Punt Returns

Kick Returns

Defense

Interceptions

Transactions
The Steelers have been involved in the following transactions during the 2015 season:

Trades

Free agents

Waivers

Signings

Cuts

Other

References

External links 
 2015 Pittsburgh Steelers season at Pro Football Reference 
 2015 Pittsburgh Steelers season statistics at jt-sw.com 

Pittsburgh
Pittsburgh Steelers seasons
2015 in sports in Pennsylvania
2010s in Pittsburgh